Jolly Musicians (Swedish: Muntra musikanter) is a 1932 Swedish comedy film directed by Theodor Berthels and Weyler Hildebrand and starring Mary Gräber, Ulla Sorbon and Anna Olin. The film's sets were designed by the art director Bibi Lindström. It takes place on Walpurgis Night in Uppsala.

Cast
 Mary Gräber as 	Mrs. Maria
 Ulla Sorbon as 	Eva, her niece
 Anna Olin as 	Mrs. Blomberg
 Lasse Dahlquist as	Erik Blomberg
 Georg Blomstedt as 	Constable
 Isa Quensel as 	Margit, his daughter
 Fridolf Rhudin as 	Fridolf Svensson
 Weyler Hildebrand as 	Julius Göransson
 Naemi Briese as 	Girl in tobacco store 
 Sonja Claesson as 	Mina 
 Eivor Engelbrektsson as 	Happy student in stroller
 Hartwig Fock as 	The Mayor 
 Jullan Jonsson as 	Kitchen manager
 John Melin as 	Policeman 
 Holger Sjöberg as 	Fat student

References

Bibliography 
 Larsson, Mariah & Marklund, Anders. Swedish Film: An Introduction and Reader. Nordic Academic Press, 2010.

External links 
 

1932 films
Swedish comedy films
1932 comedy films
1930s Swedish-language films
Films directed by Weyler Hildebrand
Films directed by Theodor Berthels
Swedish black-and-white films
Films set in Uppsala
1930s Swedish films

sv:Muntra musikanter (1932)